Arda (died after 1116) was the queen of Jerusalem as the 2nd spouse of King Baldwin I of Jerusalem. She was the first Queen consort of the Kingdom of Jerusalem, as Baldwin's brother and predecessor Godfrey of Bouillon was unmarried.

Life
Her name is unrecorded in contemporary sources, but since the 17th century she has been traditionally called Arda. She was the daughter of a minor Armenian noble named Thathoul (or Thoros), lord of Marash. Baldwin married her in 1097 after the death of his first wife, Godehilde, who had travelled with him on the First Crusade. Thoros promised 60,000 bezants as a dowry. This was a politically convenient marriage, as Baldwin was the first Count of Edessa, a crusader state carved out of Armenian territory in Mesopotamia. 

Baldwin succeeded his brother as King of Jerusalem in 1100, but Arda did not immediately accompany him south; she travelled by sea and arrived probably in 1101. In 1105 Baldwin had the marriage annulled, supposedly because Arda had been unfaithful, or, according to Guibert of Nogent, because she had been raped by pirates on the way to Jerusalem. In reality, Thoros had paid very little of the dowry, Arda had produced no children, and an Armenian wife was less useful in Jerusalem than in Edessa. Fulcher of Chartres, the chronicler closest to Baldwin, does not mention the matter at all, which likely means that Baldwin had no legitimate reason to annul the marriage. Instead, he simply forced Arda to enter the monastery of Saint Anne. Arda later demanded to be released and went to Constantinople, where her father had fled when his lands were taken over by Edessa.

In 1112 Baldwin sought to marry Adelaide del Vasto, widow of Roger I of Sicily and Regent for Roger II. The marriage was arranged, although Baldwin was legally still married to Arda. Patriarch Arnulf of Chocques was deposed for having supported the marriage, but was reinstated by Pope Paschal II in 1116, on condition that the marriage was annulled; Baldwin agreed and then attempted to bring Arda back from Constantinople. Arda never returned, and Baldwin died in 1118. The dates of Arda's birth and death are unknown.

Sources
Bernard Hamilton, "Women in the Crusader States: The Queens of Jerusalem", in Medieval Women, edited by Derek Baker. Ecclesiastical History Society, 1978.
Alan V. Murray, The Crusader Kingdom of Jerusalem: A Dynastic History, 1099-1125. Prosopographica and Genealogica, 2000.

|-
 

11th-century births
12th-century deaths
Queens consort of Jerusalem